A list of films produced in Hong Kong in 1973:.

References

External links
 IMDB list of Hong Kong films
 Hong Kong films of 1973 at HKcinemamagic.com

1973
Films
Lists of 1973 films by country or language